Alta Lake may refer to:

Alta Lake State Park, Washington, US
Alta Lake (British Columbia), British Columbia, Canada
Alta Lake, British Columbia, a former recreational community and BCR railway station, now part of the Resort Municipality of Whistler, British Columbia, Canada